Respect Is Earned II was a professional wrestling pay-per-view (PPV) event produced by Ring of Honor (ROH). It took place on June 7, 2008 from the Pennsylvania National Guard Armory in Philadelphia, Pennsylvania. It did not, however, air on pay-per-view until August 1.

Results

See also
2008 in professional wrestling
List of Ring of Honor pay-per-view events

References

External links
ROHwrestling.com

Events in Philadelphia
2008 in Philadelphia
ROH Respect is Earned
Professional wrestling in Philadelphia
June 2008 events in the United States
2008 Ring of Honor pay-per-view events